Melanchiton is a genus of beetles in the family Carabidae, containing the following 53 species:

 Melanchiton abacetoides (Burgeon, 1935) 
 Melanchiton aberrans (Chaudoir In Oberthur, 1883) 
 Melanchiton aethiops Straneo, 1950 
 Melanchiton aterrimus (Laferte-Senectere, 1853) 
 Melanchiton atratus (Klug, 1833) 
 Melanchiton basilewskyi Straneo, 1950 
 Melanchiton brevipennis Jeannel, 1948 
 Melanchiton burgeoni Straneo, 1950 
 Melanchiton camerunus Straneo, 1978 
 Melanchiton carbonatus Straneo, 1950 
 Melanchiton clarkei Straneo, 1978 
 Melanchiton congoensis Straneo, 1950 
 Melanchiton decorsei (Alluaud, 1916) 
 Melanchiton ebeninus (Erichson, 1843) 
 Melanchiton elongatus Straneo, 1950 
 Melanchiton guineensis Straneo, 1950 
 Melanchiton hulstaerti (Burgeon, 1935) 
 Melanchiton impressifrons Straneo, 1950 
 Melanchiton intermedius (Peringuey, 1896) 
 Melanchiton iridescens (Chaudoir, 1876) 
 Melanchiton kenyensis Straneo, 1950 
 Melanchiton kivuensis (Burgeon, 1935) 
 Melanchiton laevisulcis Straneo, 1950 
 Melanchiton latithorax Straneo, 1950 
 Melanchiton leleupi Straneo, 1978 
 Melanchiton longelytratus Straneo, 1950 
 Melanchiton longulus Straneo, 1950 
 Melanchiton lucidulus (Boheman, 1848) 
 Melanchiton mandibularis (Burgeon, 1935) 
 Melanchiton marginatus Straneo, 1950 
 Melanchiton mecynonotus (Alluaud, 1916) 
 Melanchiton meridionalis Straneo, 1950 
 Melanchiton motoensis (Burgeon, 1935) 
 Melanchiton nairobianus Straneo, 1950 
 Melanchiton niloticus Straneo, 1950 
 Melanchiton opacus Straneo, 1950 
 Melanchiton orientalis Straneo, 1950 
 Melanchiton parallelus (Chaudoir In Oberthur, 1883) 
 Melanchiton pinguis Straneo, 1950 
 Melanchiton proximoides Straneo, 1950 
 Melanchiton proximus (Peringuey, 1926) 
 Melanchiton pugnator (Peringuey, 1899) 
 Melanchiton quadraticollis Jeannel, 1948 
 Melanchiton rectangulus (Chaudoir In Oberthur, 1883) 
 Melanchiton rhodesianus Straneo, 1950 
 Melanchiton rufipes Straneo, 1978 
 Melanchiton senegalensis (Straneo, 1943) 
 Melanchiton sjoestedti Straneo, 1950 
 Melanchiton somalicus (Straneo, 1943) 
 Melanchiton transvaalensis Straneo, 1950 
 Melanchiton trapezicollis Straneo, 1950 
 Melanchiton vorax Straneo, 1968 
 Melanchiton zanzibaricus Straneo, 1950

References

Licininae
Taxa named by Herbert Edward Andrewes